Murex was a 3,564 gross ton M class oiler, built by William Gray & Company, West Hartlepool in 1892 for Marcus Samuel & Company.  She was the first bulk-oil tanker to pass through the Suez Canal en route to Thailand in 1892. She was chartered by the Royal Australian Navy and took part in operations against the German colonies in the Pacific with the Australian Naval and Military Expeditionary Force during the First World War in 1914, as an oiler. Murex was given the battle honour "Rabual 1914", for her service. She was later requisitioned by the Admiralty.

Fate

Citations

References

External links
Ship Stamps - Murex
Tees-built ships - Murex

1892 ships
Ships built on the River Tees
Tankers of the Royal Australian Navy
Maritime incidents in 1916
Ships sunk by German submarines in World War I
World War I shipwrecks in the Mediterranean Sea